The following is a list of South Korean films released in 2021.

Box office
The highest-grossing South Korean films released in 2021, by domestic box office gross revenue, are as follows:

Released

January–March

April–June

July–September

October–December

See also
 List of 2021 box office number-one films in South Korea
 2021 in South Korea
 Impact of the COVID-19 pandemic on cinema

References

External links

 

South Korean
2021
2021 in South Korean cinema